This is a list of films with transgender people and transgender fictional characters. This does not include documentaries, which are listed on the lists of LGBT-related films by decade or animated characters, which are noted on the List of fictional trans characters page.

Various live-action films feature either transgender issues as a plot element or have trans men, trans women or non-binary trans characters. This is distinguished from animated films with LGBTQ characters, which are not included on this list.  Films are in alphabetical order by year of release.  Titles beginning with determiners "A", "An", and "The" are alphabetized by the first significant word.

20th century

1900–1959

1960–1969

1970–1979

1980–1989

1990–1999

21st century

2000–2004

2005–2009

2010–2014

2015–2019

2020–2023

See also

 List of transgender characters in television
 List of transgender-related topics
 Media portrayals of transgender people
 List of feature films with LGBT characters
 List of film franchises with LGBT characters
 List of made-for-television films with LGBT characters
 List of comedy television series with LGBT characters
 List of dramatic television series with LGBT characters: 1960s–2000s
 List of dramatic television series with LGBT characters: 2010s
 List of dramatic television series with LGBT characters: 2020s
 List of soap operas with LGBT characters
 Lists of American television episodes with LGBT themes
 List of LGBT characters in radio and podcasts

References

Citations

Sources

External links 
 List of movies with transgender themes

Lists of LGBT-related films
Lists of character lists
Lists of entertainment lists
 
Transgender in film
Transgender-related lists